Montismyia is a genus of horse flies in the family Tabanidae.

Species
Montismyia lauta Hine, 1920

References

Tabanidae
Diptera of South America
Brachycera genera